East Atlantic Beach is a hamlet and census-designated place (CDP) in Nassau County, New York, United States. The population was 2,049 at the 2010 census. The unincorporated hamlet is governed by the Town of Hempstead, one of three towns in Nassau County.

Geography

East Atlantic Beach is located at  (40.588004, -73.705925).  The hamlet is one of five municipalities located on Long Beach Barrier Island, a barrier island lying just south of Long Island. It is surrounded by the Atlantic Ocean to the south, Reynolds Channel on the north, the village of Atlantic Beach to the west, and the city of Long Beach to the east.

Demographics

As of the census of 2000, there were 2,257 people, 887 households, and 587 families residing in the CDP. The population density was 7,544.4 per square mile (2,904.8/km2). There were 965 housing units at an average density of 3,225.7/sq mi (1,242.0/km2). The racial makeup of the CDP was 97.25% White, 0.31% African American, 0.13% Native American, 0.89% Asian, 0.66% from other races, and 0.75% from two or more races. Hispanic or Latino of any race were 3.54% of the population.

There were 887 households, out of which 28.7% had children under the age of 18 living with them, 53.2% were married couples living together, 9.1% had a female householder with no husband present, and 33.8% were non-families. 24.7% of all households were made up of individuals, and 6.5% had someone living alone who was 65 years of age or older. The average household size was 2.54 and the average family size was 3.07.

In the CDP, the population was spread out, with 21.4% under the age of 18, 5.8% from 18 to 24, 32.5% from 25 to 44, 27.1% from 45 to 64, and 13.2% who were 65 years of age or older. The median age was 40 years. For every 100 females, there were 98.5 males. For every 100 females age 18 and over, there were 99.3 males.

The median income for a household in the CDP was $71,667, and the median income for a family was $86,356. Males had a median income of $60,871 versus $38,125 for females. The per capita income for the CDP was $34,429. None of the families and 1.6% of the population were living below the poverty line, including no under eighteens and 2.4% of those over 64.

Government services 
Law enforcement for East Atlantic Beach is provided by the 4th Precinct of the Nassau County Police Department.

The East Atlantic Beach Fire District is responsible for providing fire and emergency ambulance services.  Since the district does not maintain its own fire department or ambulance service, the district contracts with the neighboring Long Beach Fire Department.

U.S. Mail Service is provided by the Long Beach Post Office.

Recreation
Two playground parks and the beach park are controlled by the Town of Hempstead. The beach park, which stretches along the entire ocean-facing length of the hamlet is staffed by Town of Hempstead lifeguards during the summer, and is a private beach. Although there is no fee, only residents of the hamlet are able to obtain seasonal beach passes for admittance.

References

External links

Hempstead, New York
Census-designated places in New York (state)
Census-designated places in Nassau County, New York
Populated coastal places in New York (state)